Grass Creek may refer to:

Grass Creek, Indiana, an unincorporated community
Grass Creek, Utah, a ghost town
Grass Creek, Wyoming, an unincorporated community
Grass Creek (Black Lake), New York, a stream
Grass Creek (South Dakota), a stream